Jacqueline Guan (born 3 November 1994) is an Australian badminton player. In 2011, she won the girls' doubles title at the Australian Junior International tournament partnered with Gronya Somerville. At the same year, she and Somerville represented their country competed at the 2011 Commonwealth Youth Games. The duo lose the girls' doubles bronze medal match to Sri Lankan pair with the score 12–21, 21–19, and 16–21. She also competed at the 2011 and 2012 World Junior Championships. In 2014, she won the gold medal at the Oceania Championships in the women's doubles event and a silver medal in the mixed doubles event. In July 2014, she competed at the Glasgow Commonwealth Games.

Achievements

Oceania Championships
Women's doubles

Mixed doubles

References

External links 
 
 
 
 
 

Living people
1994 births
Australian people of Chinese descent
Sportspeople from Melbourne
Australian female badminton players
Commonwealth Games competitors for Australia
Badminton players at the 2014 Commonwealth Games